Molinopampa is a district of the Chachapoyas Province, Peru. The district is located at an altitude of 2,407 m above sea level, covers an area of 400 km². It is located at the right bank of the Ventilla River.

Molinopampa offers several attractive places, like ruins and the River Sonche that invites to remain or go fishing, that's why also the trout is rich well in this place.

To the north the district borders the Quinjalca District (Chachapoyas) and Granada District (Chachapoyas), to the southeast with the Longar District, to the south-west the Cheto District (Chachapoyas).

Gallery 

1861 establishments in Peru
Districts of the Chachapoyas Province
Districts of the Amazonas Region